The Namestovo church was first built somewhere between 1655 and 1658 in Námestovo in what is now Slovakia. This was a chapel which now serves as an entry to the church. Later it was rebuilt and enlarged several times, after a great fire at the end of the 18th century. The church's first pastor was Ján Neborovini. Later Štefan Boczko ascended to this post. He was engaged in Piko's rebellion and he fled before punishment to Transylvania. In 1672, for the first time, Namestovo's pastorate was occupied by a catholic priest, Róbert Chmeľovsky, who was supported by Jesuit priests from Lokca's pastorage. In 1706 a Protestant pastor named Jastrabini Fabianus occupied the church. The last Protestant pastor in Namestovo was Juraj Pixiades. Pastorage in Namestovo has been occupied by Catholic priests from 1711. During the fire that happened in the 18th century, the whole upper part of Namestovo and the roof of church were burned.

The church is devoted to the saints Simon and Juda, who are considered as patrons of the city and figure also on the city's blazon.

External links
 Namestovo's official page
3D Rendered Namestovo's church

Churches in Slovakia